Osice is a municipality and village in Hradec Králové District in the Hradec Králové Region of the Czech Republic. It has about 500 inhabitants.

Administrative parts
Villages of Polizy and Trávník are administrative parts of Osice.

Notable people
František Škroup (1801–1862), composer and conductor, author of the Czech national anthem
Jan Nepomuk Škroup (1811–1892), composer and conductor

Gallery

References

External links

Villages in Hradec Králové District